Thomas Beetham is an American lightweight rower. He won a gold medal at the 1993 World Rowing Championships in Račice with the lightweight men's four.  The Swiss came in second.

References

Year of birth missing (living people)
Living people
American male rowers
World Rowing Championships medalists for the United States